Ungmennafélag Bolungarvíkur, also known as simply UMFB or Bolungarvík, is a multi-sport club based in Bolungarvík, Iceland. It was founded on 1 April 1907 and its first chairman was Jóhann Jónsson. During its history it has had departments in basketball, chess, Esports, football, skiing and swimming amongst others.

Basketball

Men's basketball

History
UMFB's basketball department was founded in 1989. In 1992, it won the 2. deild karla after beating Gnúpverjar in the playoffs. ÍFL had originally defeated UMFB during the group stage of the playoffs and Gnúpverjar in the finals. However, ÍFL had used an illegal player and as an result of an official complaint, UMFB was awarded a 2–0 victory which meant they finished with the best record in their group and faced Gnúpverjar in the finals rematch.

Honours
2. deild karla (1):
1991-92

Head coaches
Managers since 1989:
Guðjón Már Þorsteinsson
Richard Ray Clark
Helgi Pálsson 2000-2002
Sigurður Þ. Stefánsson 2002-2003
Karl Jónsson 2003-2004
Birgir Olgeirsson 2004-2005
Neil Shiran Þórisson 2010, 2011-2012
Þórir Guðmundsson 2010-2011
Borce Ilievski 2012

Notable players
 Baldur Ingi Jónasson
 Birgir Örn Birgisson
 Hjörtur Oddsson
 Jón Oddsson
 Pétur Már Sigurðsson

Esports

History
In January 2021, UMFB started an Esports department.

Football

Men's football

History
From 2006 to 2016, UMFB fielded a joint team with Boltafélag Ísafjarðar, called BÍ/Bolungarvík. In 2008 the team was promoted to 2. deild karla and in 2010 to 1. deild karla. In October 2010 the team hired Guðjón Þórðarson as their manager. In 2016 Boltafélag Ísafjarðar merged into Íþróttafélagið Vestri along with Skellur (Volleyball), Sundfélagið Vestri (Swim) and KFÍ (Basketball).

Notable players
 Andri Rúnar Bjarnason

Women's football

History
UMFB fielded a joint team with Boltafélag Ísafjarðar periodically from 2006 under the name BÍ/Bolungarvík. The team last played during the 2015 season in the second-tier 1. deild kvenna when it fielded a joint team with Íþróttafélag Reykjavíkur under the name ÍR/BÍ/Bolungarvík.

References

External links
Official web site
KKÍ.is team site

1907 establishments in Iceland
Basketball teams in Iceland
Basketball teams established in 1989
Football clubs in Iceland
Multi-sport clubs in Iceland